Verdikal Gap (‘Verdikalska Sedlovina’ \ver-di-'kal-ska se-dlo-vi-'na\) is the flat ice-covered saddle with an elevation of 801 m located on Trinity Peninsula in Graham Land, Antarctica. It is part of the ice divide between Bransfield Strait and Prince Gustav Channel. It extends 5.3 km between Louis-Philippe Plateau to the north and Mount Canicula and Trakiya Heights to the south, and overlooks Russell West Glacier to the west and Russell East Glacier to the southeast.

The gap is named after the settlement of Verdikal in Western Bulgaria.

Location
German-British mapping in 1996.

Maps
 Trinity Peninsula. Scale 1:250000 topographic map No. 5697. Institut für Angewandte Geodäsie and British Antarctic Survey, 1996.
 Antarctic Digital Database (ADD). Scale 1:250000 topographic map of Antarctica. Scientific Committee on Antarctic Research (SCAR). Since 1993, regularly updated.

Notes

References
 Verdikal Gap. SCAR Composite Antarctic Gazetteer.
 Bulgarian Antarctic Gazetteer. Antarctic Place-names Commission. (details in Bulgarian, basic data in English)

External links
 Verdikal Gap. Copernix satellite image

Mountain passes of Trinity Peninsula
Bulgaria and the Antarctic